John Carter (October 22, 1907 – February 22, 1982) was an American sound engineer. He won an Academy Award for Best Sound for the film Jaws. He worked on more than 110 films between 1944 and 1980.

Selected filmography
 Jaws (1975)

References

External links

1907 births
1982 deaths
American audio engineers
Best Sound Mixing Academy Award winners
People from Gainesville, Virginia
Engineers from Virginia
20th-century American engineers